Mark A. Parkinson (born October 30, 1972) is a Republican former member of the Missouri House of Representatives, representing the 105th district (St. Charles County).

Personal life

Background and education
Parkinson is a St. Charles County native, graduating from Francis Howell High School.  He received a Bachelor of Arts degree in Political Science from Saint Louis University in 2000.  He was married to Brigit Parkinson until 2021.

Group memberships
Parkinson holds lifetime membership with the National Rifle Association, and is also a member of Ducks Unlimited, Missouri Right to Life, and the National Park Foundation.  In the St. Charles area, Parkinson is a member of the St. Charles chapter of the Pachyderms, a Republican social club.

Political career

Pre-elected career
In 2000, Parkinson began working for the St. Louis office of United States Senator Kit Bond.  During his time with Bond, he eventually became the deputy district director of the St. Louis office, overseeing that office's constituent relations and constituent outreach programs.  Among other responsibilities, Parkinson coordinated and conducted Bond's "Listening Post" program, holding local question-and-answer sessions across 17 counties in northeast Missouri.

Prior to his role with Bond, Parkinson also worked closely with the St. Louis Senate office of then-U.S. Senator and future U.S. Attorney General John Ashcroft.

Elected career and legislation
In 2007, Parkinson announced his intention to run for the 16th district state representative seat vacated by Carl Bearden, and was selected by the local Republican legislative committee to run as the party's candidate.  Due to the nature of the election, there was no primary, and Parkinson faced Democrat Tom Fann in a special election held on the same day as Missouri's 2008 presidential primary.  Despite over 500 more Democratic primary ballots being drawn, Parkinson won by 3%, and was sworn in on February 26, 2008.

Despite Parkinson's shortened timeframe during his first term, he sponsored immigration reform legislation that was eventually incorporated into an omnibus immigration bill and signed by governor Matt Blunt. For his work on this issue, he was recognized as one of the freshmen legislators of the year.

Parkinson was reelected in November 2008.  During the 2009 session of the Missouri General Assembly, Parkinson has sponsored legislation dealing with immigration reform, property tax reform, tax deductions for homeschooling families, truth in sentencing legislation, and other issues.  Parkinson was reelected in 2010.  In 2012, following decennial redistricting, the former 16th district was renumbered as the 105th district, to which Parkinson was reelected. Parksinson could not seek reelection in 2016 due to term limits and was succeeded by Phil Christofanelli (R-Saint Peters).

Committee assignments
2008 legislative session
Tax Reform;
Financial Institutions;
Transportation; and
Joint Transportation Oversight Committee.

2009–2010 legislative session
International Trade and Immigration (Vice-Chair);
Fiscal Review;
Homeland Security; and;
Special Committee on General Laws.

2011–2012 legislative session
Appropriations – General Administration, Chairman
Budget
General Laws
Fiscal Review
International Trade and Job Creation
Joint Committee on Capital Improvements and Leases Oversight, Vice-Chairman
Joint Committee on Legislative Research

2013–2014 legislative session
Appropriations – General Administration, Chairman
Government Oversight and Accountability, Vice-Chairman
Budget
Elementary and Secondary Education
General Laws

2015–2016 legislative session
Consumer Affairs, Chairman
Select Committee on Judiciary
Appropriations – Higher Education
Employment Security

Electoral history

References

External links
Official Missouri House of Representatives profile for Mark Parkinson
Campaign Website
Official Website
Mark Parkinson on Twitter

1972 births
21st-century American politicians
Living people
Republican Party members of the Missouri House of Representatives
People from St. Charles, Missouri
Saint Louis University alumni